Δ6-Protoilludene synthase (EC 4.2.3.135, 6-protoilludene synthase) is an enzyme with systematic name (2E,6E)-farnesyl-diphosphate diphosphate-lyase (cyclizing, Δ6-protoilludene-forming). This enzyme catalyses the following chemical reaction

 (2E,6E)-farnesyl diphosphate  Δ6-protoilludene + diphosphate

This enzyme is isolated from the fungus Armillaria gallica.

References

External links 
 

EC 4.2.3